Hans Walter Heinsheimer (September 25, 1900 – October 12, 1993) was a music publisher, author, and journalist. George Antheil describes him as having an important role in the development of opera in Central Europe between World War I and World War II. "To him," Antheil writes, "Germany owed much of her new brilliant opera renaissance," including Kurt Weill's The Threepenny Opera.

Life and work
Heinsheimer was born in Karlsruhe. After obtaining a law degree and working as an unpaid intern, he was hired at age 23 by the grand rights (staged works) division of Viennese music publisher Universal Edition, eventually becoming head of the opera department. There he supported composers Alban Berg and Leoš Janáček and wrote many articles for the music periodical  [Dawn] about issues in the music industry and the sociology of music. He was the force behind Universal's hugely popular successes in the 1920s: Jaromír Weinberger's opera Schwanda the Bagpiper and Ernst Krenek's Jonny spielt auf. He also dabbled as a stage director, including productions of Kurt Weill's Rise and Fall of the City of Mahagonny.

He was on a business trip to New York City during the Austrian Anschluss in 1938 and did not return to Austria. He found employment with the major music publisher Boosey & Hawkes and was instrumental in Boosey's publication of the works of Béla Bartók, who emigrated in 1940. Heinsheimer supported the impoverished composer – whose leukemia contributed to increasingly poor health – through a conspiracy to channel funds disguised as record royalties. At Boosey, he promoted the performance of Aaron Copland's El Salón México.

According to Bernard Holland, Heinsheimer was dismissed from Boosey in 1947 because the current head of the firm (Boosey & Hawkes), Ralph Hawkes disliked his first book, Menagerie in F Sharp. Heinsheimer went to work for the largest American music publisher at the time, G. Schirmer, Inc., becoming its vice-president in 1972. He managed the publications of composers including Leonard Bernstein, Gian Carlo Menotti, and Samuel Barber, and also brought out Albert Schweitzer's edition of Bach's organ works. He died in New York, and was described in his New York Times obituary as "One of the most influential classical-music publishers of the 20th century."

Works

He wrote Best Regards to Aida (1968), a biography of music publishers. This and his other memoirs are important biographical sources of information about 20th-century composers. His Menagerie in F Sharp also gives a first-hand account of Nazi opposition to the music of Alban Berg, Kurt Weill and others, who were accused of Kulturbolschewism and "branded as Boshevists, Communists, enemies of the state," with performance of their music forbidden. After his retirement in 1977, he contributed many articles to the supplement to first edition of the large German music encyclopedia, Die Musik in Geschichte und Gegenwart. Also, in his retirement, he made many special contributions to the arts section (Feuilleton) of the Frankfurter Allgemeine Zeitung (FAZ).

Books
 [[IArchive:menagerieinfshar027357mbp/page/n7/mode/2up|Menagerie in F-Sharp]] (New York, 1947)
 Fanfare for Two Pigeons (New York, 1952)
 Best Regards to Aida (New York, 1968)

References

External links

 "Hans W. Heinsheimer", Lexikon verfolgter Musiker und Musikerinnen der NS-Zeit (in German)]
 Interview with Hans Heinsheimer, April 4, 1986 (includes obituary from The New York Times)

Music publishers (people)
German music journalists
American writers about music
1900 births
1993 deaths
German male non-fiction writers
20th-century American essayists
20th-century American male writers
American male non-fiction writers